Moutier District was one of the three French-speaking districts of the Bernese Jura in the canton of Bern with the seat being Moutier, the other two being Courtelary and La Neuveville. It had a population of about 23,098 in 2004. The three districts were merged on 1 January 2010 to form the new district of Jura Bernois with the capital at Courtelary.

References

Former districts of the canton of Bern